Uncloudy Day, also known as Unclouded Day, is a gospel song. Originally popular in church hymnals, it has come to be recorded many times over the years since, including being an early attention-getter for future star act the Staple Singers. In 1956, their version served as an inspiration to Bob Dylan, who called it "the most mysterious thing I'd ever heard".

Song history 
Alwood related a story about the event that inspired the song:

The Staple Singers covered this song in 1956, 16-year-old Mavis Staples providing deep-voiced, soulful vocals that most assumed had come from an older woman expressing great experience, or even a man. It was also covered by the outlaw country singer Willie Nelson in 1977, and performed by both Nelson and Vermont rock band Phish at Farm Aid in 1998.

Among other artists to have recorded this song are Gloria Lynne (1954), Johnny Cash (1970), B. J. Thomas, Rory Block (1981), Myrna Summers (1981),Don Henley (1982), Doc Watson (1990), Sons of the San Joaquin (1997), Randy Travis (2003), Brad Paisley (2005), Brenda Lee (2007), The Blind Boys of Alabama (2008) and Audra Mae (2011).

Lyrics 
O they tell me of a home far beyond the skies,
O they tell me of a home far away;
O they tell me of a home where no storm clouds rise,
O they tell me of an unclouded day.

[Refrain]

O the land of cloudless day,
O the land of an unclouded day,
O they tell me of a home where no storm clouds rise,
O they tell me of an unclouded day.

O they tell me of a home where my friends have gone,
O they tell me of that land far away,
Where the tree of life in eternal bloom
Sheds its fragrance through the unclouded day.

[Refrain]

O they tell me of a King in His beauty there,
And they tell me that mine eyes shall behold
Where He sits on the throne that is whiter than snow,
In the city that is made of gold.

[Refrain]

O they tell me that He smiles on His children there,
And His smile drives their sorrows all away;
And they tell me that no tears ever come again
In that lovely land of unclouded day.

References 

1879 songs
Gospel songs